John Garang de Mabior (June 23, 1945 – July 30, 2005) was a Sudanese politician and revolutionary leader. From 1983 to 2005, he led the Sudan People's Liberation Army (SPLA) after the Second Sudanese Civil War, the comprehensive peace agreement of 2005 was signed and he briefly served as First Vice President of Sudan for 3 weeks until his death in a helicopter crash on July 30, 2005. A developmental economist by profession, Garang was a major influence on the movement that led to the foundation of South Sudan.

Early life and education
Garang, who is regarded as the founding father and symbol of unity in today's South Sudan is a member of the Dinka ethnic group. He was born into a poor family in Wangulei village Twic East County in the upper Nile region of Sudan. An orphan by the age of ten, he had his fees for school paid by a relative, going to schools in Wau and then Rumbek. In 1962 he joined the first Sudanese civil war, but because he was so young, the leaders encouraged him and others of his age to seek for education. Because of the ongoing fighting, Garang was forced to complete his secondary education in Tanzania. After winning a scholarship, he went on to earn a Bachelor of Arts degree in Economics in 1969 from Grinnell College in Iowa, United States.

He was offered another scholarship to pursue graduate studies at the University of California, Berkeley, but chose to return to Tanzania and study East African agricultural economics as a Thomas J. Watson Fellow at the University of Dar es Salaam (UDSM). At UDSM, he was a member of the University Students' African Revolutionary Front. However, Garang soon decided to return to Sudan and join the rebels.. There is much erroneous reporting that Garang met and befriended Yoweri Museveni, future president of Uganda, at this time; while both Garang and Museveni were students at UDSM in the 1960s, they did not attend at the same time. In 1970, Garang was in one of the batches of Gordon Muortat Mayen's soldiers, the then leader of the Anyanya liberation movement, sent to Israel for military training.

The civil war ended with the Addis Ababa Agreement of 1972 and Garang, like many rebels, was absorbed into the Sudanese military.  For eleven years, he was a career soldier and rose from the rank of captain to colonel after taking the Infantry Officers Advanced Course at Fort Benning, Georgia, United States. During this period he took four years academic leave and received a Master's degree in agricultural economics from Iowa State University (ISU). In 1981, he earned a PhD in Economics from Iowa State University (ISU). By 1983, Col. Garang was serving as a senior instructor in the military academy in Wadi Sayedna 21 km from the centre of Omdurman where he instructed the cadets for more than four years. Later he was nominated to serve in the military research department at Army HQ in Khartoum.

Political ideology 
Garang coined the philosophy of "Sudanism" which would be the guiding philosophy to a secular and multiethnic New Sudan. He believed, for the people of Sudan to live in cohesion, they must not separate themselves into the many existing ethnic factions present within the nation but, rather, to collectively renounce the belief that Arabness, Black African-ness, Islam or Christianity were to be the ultimate defining characteristics of Sudan. Rather, he willed that citizens should embrace all cultures of Sudan, and to unify under the one commonality they all share, being Sudanese.

Rebel leader

In 1983, Garang went to Bor and southern government soldiers in Battalion 105 who were resisting being rotated to posts in the north. However, he was not among the officers in the Southern command arranging for the defection of Battalion 105 to the anti-government rebels, but he was supporting the revolution. When the 105 Battalion attacked Sudanese army in Bor on 16th May 1983, Garang rode by an alternative route to join them in the rebel stronghold in Ethiopia. By the end of July, Sudan People's Liberation Army/Movement (SPLA) had brought over 3000 soldiers into the newly created Sudan People's Liberation Army/Movement (SPLA/M), which was opposed to military rule and Islamic dominance of the country, and encouraged other army garrisons to mutiny against the Islamic law imposed on the country by the government. William Nyuon Bany and Kerubino Kwanyin Bol were both founding members of SPLA. Bany was appointed the 3rd high-ranking Commander after Bol.

This action marked the commonly agreed upon the beginning of the Second Sudanese Civil War, which resulted in one and a half million deaths over twenty years of conflict. Although Garang was Christian and most of southern Sudan is non-Muslim (mostly animist), he did not initially focus on the religious aspects of the war.

Garang was a strong advocate for national unity: minorities together formed a majority and therefore should rule. Together, Garang believed, they could replace President Omar al-Bashir with a government made up of representatives from “all tribes and religions in Sudan." His first real effort for the cause, under his command, occurred in July 1985 with the SPLA’s incursion into Kordofan.

The SPLA gained the backing of Libya, Uganda, and Ethiopia. Garang and his army controlled a large part of the southern regions of the country, named "New Sudan". He claimed his troops' courage came from "the conviction that we are fighting a just cause. That is something North Sudan and its people don't have." Critics suggested financial motivations to his rebellion, noting that much of Sudan's oil wealth lies in the south of the country.

In the early 1991, Mengistu Haile Mariam's regime (in Ethiopia) was overthrown by the Khartoum backed Ethiopian rebels (Ethiopian People's Revolutionary Democratic Front). Upon the rebels’ seizure of the government, they closed all SPLA training camps in Ethiopia and cut off the SPLA's arms supply, forcing the SPLA to return hundreds of thousands of Sudanese back to South Sudan. This disrupted military operations and leadership within the SPLA. However, this caused the West to reconsider relations with the SPLA – justifying their providing the SPLA with "non-lethal help."

Shortly after, there were leadership misunderstanding between Garang and senior SPLA commanders, Riek Machar and Lam Akol in August 1991. The splinter group led by Machar and Akol was named the SPLA-Nasir. This resulted into Bor Massacre which rages civilians and did expose the deep ethnic divides within the SPLA.  The Southern Sudanese communities became more divided than ever before in their history. These organic divides among the Southern Sudanese communities were exacerbated by the deliberate "divide and rule" policies instituted by the regimes in Khartoum, in order to maintain their power over the Southern Sudanese peoples. SPLA-Nasir accused Garang of ruling by force, in a "dictatorial reign of terror"; but ethnic rivalry seemed to have a part, with the Nasir faction mainly composed of Nuer, and Garang's supporters mainly Dinka people. Months of fighting between the two factions left thousands dead in early 1992. The SPLA-Nasir also raised the idea of an independent south (whereas Garang wanted unity).

On September 14, 1992, Bany, who was at the time Deputy Commander-in-Chief of the SPLA and Deputy Chairman of the SPLM, announced his defection from the SPLA, and escaped Garang territory. The following day, Commander Salva Kiir Mayardit was promoted from Chief of Staff to Bany's old positions of Deputy Commander-in-Chief and Deputy Chairman. Bany joined forces with Machar and Akol, and later joined forces with Bol to form SPLA-United, Sudanese People's Liberation Army-United.

Garang had refused to participate in the 1985 interim government or the 1986 elections, remaining a rebel leader. However, the SPLA and government signed a peace agreement on January 9, 2005, in Nairobi, in Kenya. On July 9, 2005, he was sworn in as the First-Vice-President - the second most powerful person in the country - following a ceremony in which he and President Omar al-Bashir signed a power-sharing constitution. Simultaneously, he became the premier in southern Sudan. This administration had limited autonomy for six years, at the end of which there would be a scheduled referendum regarding secession. No Christian or southerner had ever held such a high government post. Commenting after this ceremony, Garang stated, "I congratulate the Sudanese people, this is not my peace or the peace of al-Bashir, it is the peace of the Sudanese people."

In the Hillcrest Hotel in Nairobi on New Year's Day 2003, there was a meeting between the SPLA and the Fur people. Garang asked two associates of Abdul Wahid al Nur (who later formed the Sudan Liberation Movement) to declare that the Fur people were with the SPLA – they refused.

Over 15 months, starting in September 2003, Ali Osman and Garang met in private in Naivasha. Their secret meetings and negotiations lasted up until the Comprehensive Peace Agreement (CPA) was initialed on New Year's Eve 2004.

The CPA appeared to embody the vision of the "New Sudan" that Garang wanted. Within the CPA, power was split between the National Congress Party and the Sudan People's Liberation Movement for six years, until 2010, with Garang as the first vice-president.

As a leader, John Garang's democratic credentials were often questioned. For example, according to Gill Lusk, "John Garang did not tolerate dissent and anyone who disagreed with him was either imprisoned or killed". Under his leadership, the SPLA was accused of human rights abuses.

The ideological profile of SPLA was as shadowy as Garang himself.
He varied from Marxism to drawing support from Christian fundamentalists in the US.

The United States State Department argued that Garang's presence in the government would have helped solve the Darfur conflict in western Sudan, but others consider these claims "excessively optimistic". U.S. President George W. Bush, who supported South Sudanese independence, especially considered Garang to be a promising leader and called him a "partner in peace." Bush highlighted Garang's Christian faith, and even connected him to support at evangelical churches in his hometown of Midland, Texas.

Garang effectively used radio to advance his cause.

Death
In late July 2005, Garang died after the Ugandan presidential Mi-172 helicopter he was flying in crashed. He had been returning from a meeting in Rwakitura with long-time ally President Yoweri Museveni of Uganda. He did not tell the Sudanese government that he was going to this meeting and therefore did not take the presidential plane. In fact, Garang had said he was going to spend the weekend in New Cush, a small village near the Kenyan borders founded by Garang himself. To this day neither the identity of any other participants at the meeting nor its purpose, are known. 

After the helicopter had been missing for more than 24 hours, the Ugandan president notified the Sudanese government, which in turn contacted the SPLM for information. The SPLM responded that the helicopter Garang was taking had landed safely on an old SPLA training camp. The Sudanese state television duly reported this. A few hours later, Abdel Basset Sabdarat, Sudan's Information Minister, then appeared on TV to refute the earlier report that Garang's helicopter landed safely. It was, in fact, Yasir Arman, the SPLA/M spokesperson, who had told the government that Garang's plane had landed safely and his intention, in doing so, was to buy time for internal succession arrangements within the SPLA, before Garang's death was to be declared. Garang's helicopter crashed on Friday and he remained 'missing' throughout Saturday. During this time, the government believed he was still resolving his affairs in Southern Sudan. Finally, a statement released by the office of the Sudanese President, Omar el-Bashir, confirmed that the Ugandan presidential helicopter had crashed into "a mountain range in southern Sudan because of poor visibility and this resulted in the death of Dr. John Garang DeMabior, six of his colleagues and seven Ugandan crew members."
According to the Sudan Tribune John Garang's legacy was a major cornerstone in South Sudan's fight for independence. Without Garang, many marginalized people of Africa, including that of Sudan would still be largely forgotten about in the modern world. 

His body was flown to New Cush, a southern Sudanese settlement near the scene of the crash, where former rebel fighters and civilian supporters gathered to pay their respects to Garang. Garang's funeral took place on August 3 in Juba.  His widow, Rebecca Nyandeng De Mabior, promised to continue his work stating: In our culture we say "if you kill the lion, you see what the lioness will do".

Rumors
Both the Sudanese government and the head of the SPLA blamed the weather for the accident. There are, however, doubts as to whether this was the true cause, especially among the rank and file of the SPLA. Yoweri Museveni, the Ugandan President, stated that the possibility of "external factors" having played a role could not be eliminated.

The SPLM/SPLA Rumbek crisis, which took place in Rumbek from November 29 to December 1, 2004; one month before the signing of the CPA is also believed to have been a factor relevant to John Garang's death.

While the Sudanese people followed the Naivasha peace talks closely, with high hopes of freedom and democratic transformation, the Sudan People’s Liberation Movement (SPLM) was rife with rumors and accusations of conspiracy relating to the removal of SPLM deputy Chairman, Salva Kiir Mayardit, and his replacement with the young Nhial Deng Nhial. Nhial Deng Nhial was the son of the famous leader of the southern Sudanese, William Deng Nhial, who had been assassinated by the Sudanese army in 1968. William Deng Nhial had led the Sudan African National Union (SANU) in exile, but had returned to Sudan to take part in the 1968 elections, shortly before he was killed. It has been reported that Salva Kiir disagreed with the amnesty afforded to Riek Machar and Lam Akol after their coup attempt against Garang in 2003; he also disliked Garang's decision to give Machar a leadership position as his deputy. It is rumored that in response to these actions by Garang, Kiir threatened to lead an armed revolt against South Sudan's leadership.

See also
Assassination of Juvénal Habyarimana and Cyprien Ntaryamira
First Sudanese Civil War
List of unsolved deaths
Second Sudanese Civil War
Sudan People's Liberation Army

References 

 Aufstand in der Dreistadt by Thomas Schimidinger in Jungle World Nr.32: August 10, 2005; ISSN 1613-0766

Publications
Garang, John, 1987 John Garang Speaks.  M. Khalid, ed.  London:  Kegan Paul International.

External links 

  of the Sudan People's Liberation Army
A State Department archive of information from before January 2001
 Sudan ex-rebel joins government, BBC, July 9, 2005
Obituary, BBC
 Deadly riots erupt in Sudan after Garang death, Reuters, August 1, 2005
 The return of a Sudanese survivor, opinion piece in The Daily Star, Lebanon, July 19, 2005 – some info on early life
Uganda Joins Sudan in Investigating Garang's Death, William Eagle, Voice of America, August 9, 2005

1945 births
2005 deaths
De Mabior family
Dinka people
Grinnell College alumni
Iowa State University alumni
People from Jonglei State
Second Sudanese Civil War
South Sudanese Protestants
SPLM/SPLA Political-Military High Command
State leaders killed in aviation accidents or incidents
Sudanese expatriates in Tanzania
Sudanese expatriates in the United States
Sudan People's Liberation Movement politicians
University of Dar es Salaam alumni
Unsolved deaths
Vice presidents of Sudan
Victims of aviation accidents or incidents in Sudan
Victims of aviation accidents or incidents in 2005
Victims of helicopter accidents or incidents
Watson Fellows